Solar cycle 18 was the eighteenth solar cycle since 1755, when extensive recording of solar sunspot activity began. The solar cycle lasted 10.2 years, beginning in February 1944 and ending in April 1954.  The maximum smoothed sunspot number observed during the solar cycle was 218.7 (May 1947), and the starting minimum was 12.9. During the minimum transit from solar cycle 18 to 19, there were a total of 446 days with no sunspots.

Cycle 18 was characterized by "giant" sunspots. The recording of the 10.7 cm (2800 MHz) solar radio flux began partway during this cycle, and values of the solar flux during this cycle turned out to be particularly high.

See also
List of solar cycles

References

Solar cycles